Tambja blacki is a species of sea slug, a dorid nudibranch, a marine gastropod mollusk in the family Polyceridae.

Distribution
This species was originally described from Papua New Guinea and eastern Australia.

References

Polyceridae
Gastropods described in 2006